Frederick Thompson (1870–1898) was an English footballer who played in the Football League for Nottingham Forest. His only appearance for Forest was on 10 September 1892 in a 4–3 defeat against Stoke.

References

1870 births
1898 deaths
English footballers
Association football midfielders
English Football League players
Sheffield Wednesday F.C. players
Lincoln City F.C. players
Nottingham Forest F.C. players